Shifting Gears may refer to:

Changing gears in controlling a motor vehicle or other machine: see gearbox
Shifting Gears (Cooder Graw album), a 2001 album by Cooder Graw
Shifting Gears (Nancy Sinatra album), a 2013 album by Nancy Sinatra
Shifting Gears (Z-Trip album), a 2005 album by musician DJ Z-Trip
Shifting Gears: A Bisexual Transmission, a 2008 bisexual pornographic film written and directed by Chi Chi LaRue
Shifting Gears with Aaron Kaufman, 2018 TV series centered on a Texas custom car builder and racer
Shifting Gears, a 2015 album by Thirsty Merc
Shifting Gears (film), a 2018 film starring C. Thomas Howell